Veera Sindhoora Lakshmana (Kannada: ವೀರ ಸಿಂಧೂರ ಲಕ್ಷ್ಮಣ) is a 1977 Indian Kannada film, directed by Hunsur Krishnamurthy and produced by N. Basavaraj. The film stars Basavaraj, K. S. Ashwath, Sudheer and Vajramuni in the lead roles. The film has musical score by T. G. Lingappa.

Cast

Basavaraj
K. S. Ashwath
Sudheer
Vajramuni
Hanumanthachar
Thipatur Siddaramaiah
Vasantharao Nakod
G. V. Krishna
Ramarao Desai
Anilraj
Haveri Babanna
Manjula
Anuradha
M. Leelavathi
Shanthamma Belagam
Rajalakshmi Davanagere
Nagarathnamma
Vanajakshi
Therisamma
Radha
Rukmini

References

External links
 
 

1977 films
1970s Kannada-language films
Films scored by T. G. Lingappa
Films directed by Hunsur Krishnamurthy